Torbern Olaf (Olof) Bergman (KVO) (20 March 17358 July 1784) was a Swedish chemist and mineralogist noted for his 1775 Dissertation on Elective Attractions, containing the largest chemical affinity tables ever published.  Bergman was the first chemist to use the A, B, C, etc., system of notation for chemical species.

Early life and education
Torbern was born on 20 March 1735, the son of Barthold Bergman and Sara Hägg. He enrolled at the University of Uppsala at age 17. His father wished him to read either law or divinity, while he himself was anxious to study mathematics and natural science; in the effort to please both himself and his father, he overworked himself and harmed his health. During a period of enforced abstinence from study, he amused himself with field botany and entomology. He was able to send Linnaeus specimens of several new kinds of insects, and in 1756 he succeeded in proving that, contrary to the opinion of that naturalist, the so-called Coccus aquaticus was really the ovum of a kind of leech. He returned to the university in 1758, and received his PhD in that year.

Career

Bergman lectured at the University of Uppsala on physics and mathematics, publishing papers on the rainbow, the aurora, the pyroelectric phenomena of tourmaline. Upon the resignation of the celebrated Johan Wallerius, Bergman was a candidate for the professorship of chemistry and mineralogy. His competitors charged him with ignorance of the subject, because he had never written on it. To refute them, he shut himself up for some time in a laboratory, and prepared a treatise on the manufacture of alum, which became a standard work. Thanks to the influence of Gustav III, then crown prince and chancellor of the university, he was appointed a professor of chemistry, and remained at this position for the rest of his life.

Bergman greatly contributed to the advancement of quantitative analysis, and he developed a mineral classification scheme based on chemical characteristics and appearance. He is noted for his research on the chemistry of metals, especially bismuth and nickel.

In 1764, Bergman was elected a member of the Royal Swedish Academy of Sciences. In April 1765 he was elected a Fellow of the Royal Society of London. In 1773 he was elected a member of the American Philosophical Society. In March 1782, he was elected Foreign Associate of the French Academy of Sciences.

In 1771, six years after he first discovered carbonated water and four years after Joseph Priestley first created artificially carbonated water, Bergman perfected a process to make carbonated water from chalk by the action of sulphuric acid. He is also noted for his sponsorship of Carl Wilhelm Scheele, whom some deem to be Bergman's "greatest discovery". The translation into English of his book Physical and Chemical Essays was read widely and regarded as the first systematic method of chemical analysis.

Personal life
In 1771, Bergman married Margareta Catharina Trast.

Legacy
In Bergman's honour, the uranium mineral torbernite and the lunar crater Bergman both bear his name.

Works

 
 
 
 
 
 
 
 
 
Tekniska Museet

Notes

References

Further reading
 Mostrom, Birgitta. (1957). Torbern Bergman: a bibliography of his works. Stockholm: Almqvist & Wiksell. Includes over 300 items, including translations printed up to 1956.
 Schufle, J.A. (1985). Torbern Bergman : a man before his time. Lawrence, Kan.: Coronado Press.
 
 Johannes Uray, Chemische Theorie und mineralogische Klassifikationssysteme von der chemischen Revolution bis zur Mitte des 19. Jahrhunderts. In: Berhard Hubmann, Elmar Schübl, Johannes Seidl (eds.), Die Anfänge geologischer Forschung in Österreich. Beiträge zur Tagung „10 Jahre Arbeitsgruppe Geschichte der Erdwissenschaften Österreichs" von 24. bis 26. April 2009 in Graz. Graz 2010, S 107–125.

External links
Torbern Bergman Biography – by James S. Aber
Bergman, Torbern (1735–1784). Opuscula Physica et Chemica. 6 vols. Uppsala, 1780.
Bergman's chemical genealogy
Physisk Beskrifning öfver Jord-Klotet (2 volumes, 1773) – full digital facsimile from Linda Hall Library

1735 births
1784 deaths
18th-century Swedish chemists
Swedish mineralogists
Uppsala University alumni
Members of the Royal Swedish Academy of Sciences
Fellows of the Royal Society
Members of the American Philosophical Society
Members of the Göttingen Academy of Sciences and Humanities